David Helbach (born December 8, 1948) is an American Democratic politician from Wisconsin.

Born in Stevens Point, Wisconsin, Helbach graduated from Pacelli High School and then received his degree in communications from University of Wisconsin–Stevens Point. Helbach served in the Wisconsin State Assembly 1979-1983 and then was elected to the Wisconsin State Senate in a special election in 1983 serving until 1995. Recently, Helbach served as administrator of the Wisconsin state division of facilities.

Notes

People from Stevens Point, Wisconsin
University of Wisconsin–Stevens Point alumni
Democratic Party Wisconsin state senators
Democratic Party members of the Wisconsin State Assembly
1948 births
Living people